The women's heptathlon event at the 1990 World Junior Championships in Athletics was held in Plovdiv, Bulgaria, at Deveti Septemvri Stadium on 10 and 11 August.

Medalists

Results

Final
10/11 August

Participation
According to an unofficial count, 15 athletes from 11 countries participated in the event.

References

Heptathlon
Combined events at the World Athletics U20 Championships